Kundalini is a spiritual energy in yogic philosophy.

Kundalini may also refer to:
Yoga-kundalini Upanishad, the secret doctrine of Kundalini Yoga (Vedic Yoga Philosophy)
Kundalini yoga, schools of yoga

See also
Kundalini: The Evolutionary Energy in Man, the 1967 autobiography of Pandit Gopi Krishna